Lee Morgan Vol. 3 is the third album by jazz trumpeter Lee Morgan released on the Blue Note label. It was recorded on March 24, 1957 and features performances by Morgan, Gigi Gryce, Benny Golson, Wynton Kelly, Paul Chambers and Charlie Persip. The Allmusic review by Scott Yanow described  the album as "A fine hard bop date".

Track listing 
All compositions by Benny Golson.
 "Hasaan's Dream" - 8:44
 "Domingo" - 9:22
 "I Remember Clifford" - 7:07
 "Mesabi Chant" - 6:09
 "Tip-Toeing" - 6:39
 "Tip-Toeing" [Alternate Take] - 6:40 Bonus track on CD

Personnel 
 Lee Morgan - trumpet
 Benny Golson - tenor saxophone
 Gigi Gryce - alto saxophone, flute
 Wynton Kelly - piano
 Paul Chambers - bass
 Charlie Persip - drums

References

Hard bop albums
Lee Morgan albums
1957 albums
Blue Note Records albums
Albums produced by Alfred Lion
Albums recorded at Van Gelder Studio